Bhitti is the autobiography of kannada novelist S.L. Bhyrappa. First published in 1996, the book had 11 reprints as of May, 2018 and has been translated to Hindi, Marathi and English languages.

References

1996 non-fiction books
Indian autobiographies
Indian biographies
20th-century Indian novels
21st-century Indian books
Kannada novels